Dewantara class is a class of frigate or corvette intended as training ship that were built in SFR Yugoslavia. Three ships were planned, with each ordered by Iraqi Navy, Indonesian Navy, and Yugoslav Navy. The Yugoslav ship was never completed, while the other two were commissioned in 1980 and 1981 respectively.

Development
Iraqi Ibn Khaldoum is the first ship in the class, which was laid down in 1977, launched in 1978, and commissioned on 20 March 1980. The Indonesian KRI Ki Hajar Dewantara was laid down on 11 May 1979, launched on 11 October 1980, and commissioned on 31 October 1981. The two ships had different machineries and weapons, with the Iraqi ship have more autocannons, while the Indonesian ship instead having helicopter deck in stern. Ki Hajar Dewantara had its hull and machineries built and installed in Yugoslavia, with her armaments and electronics installed in the Netherlands and Indonesia.

Operational history

Ibn Khaldoum
Ibn Khaldoum was later renamed as Ibn Marjid. She was mainly used for training and transport during Iran–Iraq War and still operational in 1988, despite several Iranian claims that she has been sunk. In February 1991 she was severely damaged, albeit still afloat, as the result of Operation Desert Storm. Ibn Khaldoum survived the Gulf War, but with its capability reduced as she lacked spare parts for her Roll-Royce engines.  She was sunk in the United States air attacks during the U.S. invasion of Iraq in 2003.

Ki Hajar Dewantara
In 1992, KRI Ki Hajar Dewantara, along with KRI Yos Sudarso and KRI Teluk Banten intercepted the Portuguese ship Lusitania Expresso in East Timor. Col. Widodo, deputy assistant of the Indonesian Navy's Eastern Fleet, told Radio Republik Indonesia from aboard the Indonesian warship KRI Yos Sudarso that the ferry entered Indonesian waters at 5:28 in the morning of 11 March 1992. At 6:07, Lusitania Expresso had traveled  into Indonesian territory and Captain Luis Dos Santos (Lusitania Expressos captain) was ordered to leave immediately. Col. Widodo said the Portuguese ship captain obeyed the order and turned his ship around and headed back to sea.

List of ships

See also

 Equipment of the Indonesian Navy
 List of former ships of the Indonesian Navy

Notes

References

Bibliography
 
 
 

Frigate classes
Corvette classes
Frigates of the Iraqi Navy
Corvettes of the Indonesian Navy
Training ships